Abolhassan Sadighi (5 October 1894 – 11 December 1995) was an Iranian sculptor and painter and was known as Master Sadighi. He was a student of Ghaffari.

The statue of Ferdowsi in the Ferdowsi square, the statue of Khayyam in Laleh Park of Tehran, the statue of Nader Shah in his mausoleum in Mashhad, and the portrait of Abu-Ali Sina are examples of his works.

Biography
Abolhassan Sadighi was born in Oudlajan neighborhood of Tehran on 5 October 1894. His father, Mirza Bagher Khan Sadigoddoleh, was from the residents of Nur, Mazandaran; his mother, Malakeh Khanum, was one of Qajar princesses and known as "Shajan". But they had moved to Tehran years before the birth of Sadighi and settled in Oudlajan which was, at the time, one of the high-class neighborhoods of the capital. When he was seven, Sadighi went to Agdasiyyeh school which was one of the new schools and was founded by Saeed-ol-Olama Larijani. After finishing elementary education, he went to Alians School to continue and started painting there without having any mentor; his paintings on the walls of the school incited grievances of the principals.

Although his noble family sought other dreams for him and his father was not inclined for his son to follow painting, but Sadighi's excessive interest in painting and designing made him quit studying at the last year of school and go to Kamal-ol-molk Ghaffari with his friend Ali Mohammad Heydaryan and get present in Ghaffari's class at his School of Fine Arts. After three years of studying, he achieved a high-class diploma on 1920 and started teaching students as a mentor at the same school. His outstanding protégé, Ali-Akbar San'ati, writes: "...[Sadighi] headlines in creating art so much that according to the deceased Esmail Khan Ashtiani, Lord Kamal-ol-molk often called him Mirza Abolhassan Khan the Rival for humor and encouragement!"

School of Fine Arts 

A vague internal inclination pushed Sadighi to sculpture and while there was no sculpture mentor in Iran during the time and it was not taught anywhere including the School of Fine Arts, he formed a plaster statue of a child's half-trunk on 1922 by rudimentary tools and presented it to Ghaffari. By seeing the statue, the latter realized the talent of Sadighi, who was then one of the painting teachers of the school, and turned the greenhouse of the school to a sculpture workshop and Sadighi started gaining experience in sculpture while teaching painting and also learned about theoretical aspects of sculpture by reading the books Ghaffari had brought from Europe with him.

After he formed several plaster statues and earned the necessary skills in two to three years, he one day asked Ghaffari to make it possible for him to form a stone statue. Ghaffari initially disagreed and believed Sadighi's tools and experience insufficient, but eventually approved it and accepted the expenses of the stone. Sadighi began making Vénus de Milo's statue after seeing a picture of it and finally it was finally completed on 1925. After Ghaffari noticed the fantastic talent of his protégé, the former took the latter along with Milo's statue to Ahmad Shah and in that meeting, Ahmad gave Ghaffari 50 tomans, which was a lot then, and designated a monthly salary of 20 tomans for Sadighi in order to ensure the progress and continuation of his career and Ghaffari left him in charge of the newly established sculpture workshop of the School of Fine Arts.

During that period, he formed many statues including: Ferdowsi's plaster statue, half-trunk and full stature statues of Farahani, Abolgasem (Ghaffari's serviceman), Elias the peddler, and the barber of the bath. The most prominent statue of that period, which was formed on 1926, is the Siyah-ney-zan (Haj Magbal) which was formed from patinated chalk and it is 93 centimeters high and is currently kept at National Arts Museum.

Departure to Europe 

1927 is the year Ghaffari quit from all of his posts and moved to Hoseynabad, Nishabur. During departure from Tehran, he suggested to Sadighi to go to Europe and pass his complementary education there, giving Sadighi the money he had saved from the salary coming from Ahmad. By the departure of the mentor, the protégés and teachers scattered and one year later on 1928, Sadighi went from Tehran to Astara and from there to Baku and Moscow and eventually France. He traveled across some European countries for some time and continued learning and gaining experience in sculpture and stone-cutting under Angealberr at Paris National Fine Arts High School for four years.

Sadighi, who was in Europe between the two world wars, spent most of his time painting. He painted 160 pictures in that period.

Return to Iran and marriage 

Having gained a lot of experience, Sadighi returned to Iran in March 1934. In May 1934, he married his cousin Qodrat-ol-saadaat Mirfenderesky. Having gained permission from Ghaffari, who was in a self-imposed exile, and by the help of his friend and old classmate, Ali-Mohammad Heydaryan, he established the School of Fine Arts again. After Ghaffari's death in 1940, the school was closed for unknown reasons. But after a while, another school called Beautiful Arts was founded under the Ministry of Culture. After a while, Sadighi accepted to start teaching at that school. After the foundation of Tehran University, the school continued with the same name under it and the leadership of stone-cutting academy was given to Sadighi.

National Works Board 
On 1950, Sadighi joined the National Works Board. During that time, he painted portraits of Iranian science and literature celebrities and formed remarkable statues of the celebrities. Portraits of Sa'di, Abu-Ali Sina, Ferdowsi and Hafez is the result of that period.

Eventually he retired from Tehran University on 1961, but devoted all his time and energy to sculpture. By traveling to Italy, he managed to form remarkable statues. The statue of Nader and his assistant at Nader Shah's vault in Mashhad and the statue of Ferdowsi at Ferdowsi Square of Tehran and the statue of Khayyam at Laleh Park of Tehran are the results of those years.

Final years 
During the 1979 revolution, Khayyam's statue received critical damage and its face and fingers broke as a result of stones thrown at. On 11 February 1979, an unknown group decapitated Ferdowsi's statue, which was repaired later. During the revolution, Sadighi was working on Farahani's statue in Italy. The plaster model of the statue had been completed by the time the authorities of the new administration refused to pay the following expenses and the planned bronze statue was never formed. The plaster model, which was 225 centimeters high, was formed by Lorenzo Nicolocci, but due to the change of government in Iran on 1979, its transfer to Tehran was canceled. After 33 years on 11 October 2010, the statue was installed in the Mellat Park by then Tehran municipality in a ceremony in which Sadighi's family and the municipality authorities were present.

Sadighi returned to Iran after a while and spent the last years in silence and isolation. On 29 June 1992, his wife died. He died on 11 December 1995 at 101 years of age and was buried at the artists section of Behesht-e Zahra.

After his death, memorial ceremonies were held. Also a statue of him was ordered to his son Fereydoon Sadighi, and the half-trunk statue is currently kept at the School of Beautiful Arts.

Works

Statues 

Italian sculptor Gostinus Ambrosi writes in his diary after visiting Ferdowsi's statue in Villa Borgs of Rome:

Abolhassan Sadighi has collectively formed 83 statues, from which those having accurate information have been mentioned in this list; in addition he had formed statues of contemporary famous people, including Reza Shah, Mohammad Reza Shah and Taqizadeh (then representative of Majlis), Doctor Habibi (one of the directors of agriculture school), Bayat, Kashefossaltaneh (which is in Lahijan), Karim Sa'I, Imam-Quli Khan (governor of Fars at the time of Shah Abbas the Safavid) in the central square of Qeshm.

Paintings 
Sadighi has left remarkable works in painting and his portrayals of celebrities of classic Persian literature have made their reputations permanent. In addition, he has two paintings in the Saadabad Museum and has a large painting 7 meters long and 3 meters wide in Iranian Embassy in Paris. That is the portrait of first Iranian Ilchikhan (ambassador) in the court of Louis XVI.

In his years in Europe, in addition to painting European landmarks, he had copied paintings a lot similar to works of Raphael, Rembrandt, Rubens, Ingres,... in the Louvre Museum. Rubens's painting has been destroyed as a result of poor care, but his copy of the painting of Mary and Jesus by Raphael is in the possession of his son Fereydoon Sadighi. According to that artist: "It's a complete painting of a sourced girl, and since she is too nude, you can't show it everywhere!"

Portraits 

Sadighi's portraits of Persian literature figures have grown popular as consolidated works, especially portraits of Abu-Ali Sina, Saadi and Ferdowsi.

In order to portray Abu-Ali Sina's face, an expert group was formed in 1944 and designing the face was assigned to Sadighi. In May 1945, he designed a picture with a full face by a black pen and the picture was ratified at the 21st meeting of the National Works Board and it was printed on the Ibn-I Sina lottery papers. In January 1949, a profile of that full-face portrait was painted by Sadighi and was used in stamps, medals and other things. On the same year, a six-member group including Hooshang Seyhoun and Sadighi went to Hamadan to exhume Abu-Ali Sina's grave, and his skull was examined. After building a new mausoleum, Abu-Ali's skeleton was buried once more. After that, Sadighi was assigned by the National Works Board to form a statue of Abu-Ali Sina; it was formed in 1954 and is currently located at the city of Hamadan.

Oil paint

Watercolor

Destroyed works 
 1925 – the stone statue of Vènus de Milo, the first stone statue made by Saighi. It was presented to Ahmad Shah and was never found later.
 1933 – the plaster statue of Ferdowsi riding the Simurgh (aided by Hasan-Ali Vaziri). Height: about 160 centimeters.
 1934 – plaster half-trunk Ferdowsi. Height: 70 centimeters.
 Full stature of Malekolmotakallemin from marble. It was situated in Park Shahr until 1999 and was transferred to the warehouse of the Parks Agency afterwards. In June 2006, the statue was announced missing.

See also
 Islamic art
 Iranian art
 Islamic calligraphy
 List of Iranian artists

References

External links

 
 

1894 births
1995 deaths
Iranian sculptors
People from Nur, Iran
Iranian centenarians
Men centenarians
Burials at artist's block of Behesht-e Zahra
20th-century Iranian painters
20th-century sculptors
People from Mazandaran Province